Senator Santiago may refer to:

Carmelo Ríos Santiago (born 1973), Senate of Puerto Rico
Margarita Nolasco Santiago (fl. 1990s–2010s), Senate of Puerto Rico
María de Lourdes Santiago (born 1968), Senate of Puerto Rico
Nellie R. Santiago (born 1943), New York State Senate
Nelson Cruz Santiago (born 1975), Senate of Puerto Rico
Rafael Picó Santiago (1912–1998), Senate of Puerto Rico